Procerusternarchus pixuna is a species of bluntnose knifefish endemic to Amazonas, Brazil where it occurs in several tributaries of the Rio Negro. This species is the only known member of its genus.

References

Hypopomidae
Fish described in 2014